The Hollister riot, also known as the Hollister Invasion, was an event that occurred at the American Motorcyclist Association (AMA)-sanctioned Gypsy Tour motorcycle rally in Hollister, California, from July 3 to 6, 1947.

Many more motorcyclists than expected flooded the small town to watch the annual rallies, as well as to socialize and drink. A few of the motorcyclists caused a commotion in the town.

The incident, known afterwards as the Hollister riot, was sensationalized by the press with reports of bikers "taking over the town" and "pandemonium" in Hollister. The strongest dramatization of the event was a photo of a drunken man sitting on a motorcycle, possibly  staged by the photographer by surrounding the scene with discarded beer bottles. It was published in Life magazine and it brought national attention and negative opinion to the event. The Hollister riot helped to give rise to the outlaw biker image.

Rise of motorcycles after World War II
After World War II, countless veterans came back to America and many of them had a difficult time readjusting to civilian life. They searched for the adventure and adrenaline rush associated with life at war that had now left them. Civilian life felt too monotonous for some men who also craved feelings of excitement and danger. Others sought the close bonds and camaraderie found between men in the army. Furthermore, certain men wanted to combat their horrifying war memories and experiences that haunted them, many in the form of post-traumatic stress disorder. Thus, motorcycling emerged stronger than ever as a substitute for wartime experiences such as adventure, excitement, danger and camaraderie. Men who had been a part of the motorcycling world before the war were now joined by thousands of new members. The popularity of motorcycling grew dramatically after World War II because of the effects of the war on veterans.

Event

Throughout the 1930s, Hollister, California, hosted an annual Fourth of July gypsy tour event. Gypsy tours were American Motorcyclist Association-sanctioned racing events that took place all over America and were considered to be the best place for motorcyclists to converge. The annual event consisted of motorcycle races, social activities, and much partying. In Hollister, the event and the motorcyclists were very welcome, especially because Hollister was a very small town, with only about 4,500 people, the rally became a major event in its yearly life as well as an important part of the town's economy. Due to World War II, the rally was canceled, but the event organized for 1947 was the revival of the Gypsy Tour in Hollister.

On July 3, 1947, festivities in Hollister began. But as previously mentioned, the popularity of motorcycles had grown dramatically and this rise in popularity caused one of the main problems of this event: massive attendance. Around 4,000 motorcyclists flooded Hollister, almost doubling the population of the small town. They came from all over California and the United States, even from as far away as Connecticut and Florida. Motorcycle groups in attendance included the 13 Rebels, Pissed Off Bastards of Bloomington, the Boozefighters, the Market Street Commandos, the Top Hatters Motorcycle Club, and the Galloping Goose Motorcycle Club. Approximately ten percent of attendees were women. The town was completely unprepared for the number of people that arrived, since not nearly as many people had participated in the pre-war years.

Initially the motorcyclists were welcomed into the Hollister bars, as the influx of people meant a boom in business. But soon, drunken motorcyclists were riding their bikes through the small streets of Hollister and consuming huge amounts of alcohol. They were fighting, damaging bars, throwing beer bottles out of windows, racing in the streets, and other drunken actions. There was also a severe housing problem. The bikers had to sleep on sidewalks, in parks, in haystacks and on people's lawns. By the evening of July 4, "they were virtually out of control".

The small, seven-man police force of Hollister was overwhelmed by the events. The police tried to stop the motorcyclists' activities by threatening to use tear gas and by arresting as many drunken men as they could. The bars tried in vain to stop the men from drinking by refusing to sell beer and voluntarily closing two hours ahead of time.

Eyewitnesses were quoted as saying, "It's just one hell of a mess", but that "[the motorcyclists] weren't doing anything bad, just riding up and down whooping and hollering; not really doing any harm at all."

The ruckus continued through July 5 and slowly died out at the end of the weekend as the rallies ended and the motorcyclists left town.

At the end of the Fourth of July weekend and the informal riot, Hollister was littered with thousands of beer bottles and other debris and there was some minor storefront damage. About 50 people were arrested, most with misdemeanors such as public intoxication, reckless driving, and disturbing the peace. There were around 60 reported injuries, of which three were serious, including a broken leg and skull fracture. Other than having to witness the chaos of the weekend, no Hollister residents suffered any physical harm. A City Council member stated, "Luckily, there appears to be no serious damage. These trick riders did more harm to themselves than the town."

Media coverage
The small riot came to national prominence through media coverage of the event. However, the articles that were written about the riot may have greatly exaggerated and sensationalized the actual events.

Firstly, shortly after the Fourth of July weekend, two articles were published in the San Francisco Chronicle. With titles "Havoc in Hollister" and "Hollister's Bad Time", they both described the event as "pandemonium" and "terrorism". While the articles did not actually lie about the events that occurred, the perspectives of the articles were both negative toward the motorcyclists involved. Despite this, the Chronicle article did little to cause panic for citizens in the California area as there was other major news occurring at the same time, including local labor strikes. The initial reporting reached a larger audience a few weeks later, with an article published in the July 21, 1947, issue of Life magazine. The article was published in the photojournalism section of Life, relying heavily on graphic images and sparse explanatory text. This was shown as single-page article, with a nearly full-page photo above a small 115-word insert of text with the headline "Cyclist's Holiday: He and Friends Terrorize Town."

The large photo, taken by Barney Peterson of the San Francisco Chronicle, shows a drunken man, sitting atop a large motorcycle, holding a beer bottle in each hand and surrounded by many other empty, broken bottles. The man was later identified as Eddie Davenport, a member of the Tulare Riders motorcycle club.

The reliability of the striking photo has been debated, with some sources suggesting that the scene was overtly staged. While the photograph was taken by Barney Petersen of the San Francisco Chronicle. the Chronicle did not run it, nor any other images, in their initial two articles covering the event. The bearded individual standing in the immediate background of the photograph, Gus Deserpa, has said he is sure that the photograph was staged by Petersen, and gave the following account: "I saw two guys scraping all these bottles together, that had been lying in the street. Then they positioned a motorcycle in the middle of the pile. After a while this drunk guy comes staggering out of the bar, and they got him to sit on the motorcycle, and started to take his picture." Deserpa claims he deliberately tried to sabotage the staging by stepping into the shot, but to no avail.

Barney Peterson's colleague at the Chronicle, photographer Jerry Telfer, said it was implausible that Peterson would have faked the photos. Telfer said, "Barney was not the type to fake a picture. Barney was the kind of fellow who had a very keen sense of ethics, pictorial ethics as well as word ethics."

Consequences

The news of rogue motorcyclists causing havoc in small towns such as Hollister was not comforting to Americans still recovering from World War II and scared of the impending Cold War. The nation started to fear motorcycle "hoodlums" and potential rampages.

The AMA purportedly released a statement saying that they had no involvement with the Hollister riot, and, "the trouble was caused by the one per cent deviant that tarnishes the public image of both motorcycles and motorcyclists" and that the other ninety-nine per cent of motorcyclists are good, decent, law-abiding citizens. However, the American Motorcyclist Association has no record of ever releasing such a statement. A representative of the AMA said in 2005, "we've been unable to attribute [the term 'one-percenter'] original use to an AMA official or published statement — so it's apocryphal." The AMA's statement led to "one-percenter" being widely used to describe outlaw motorcycle clubs and motorcyclists.

The Hollister riot had little effect on the town. The nationwide fear of motorcyclists did not result in many changes in Hollister. Bikers were welcomed back and rallies continued to be held in the years after the riot. In fact, the town held a 1997 50th anniversary rally to commemorate the event.

Adaptations
A short story, "Cyclists' Raid" by Frank Rooney, is based on the events of the Hollister riot and was originally published in the January 1951 issue of Harper's Magazine. 

The Hollister riot inspired the 1953 film The Wild One, starring Marlon Brando. While the film bears little resemblance to the actual events, it brought the incident into public light and introduced the popular image of motorcyclists as misfits and outlaws.

References

1947 riots
1947 in the United States
Riots and civil disorder in California
Hollister, California
1947 in California
July 1947 events in the United States
Motorcycling subculture in the United States
Motorcycle racing controversies